Otto Christian Neuman was a member of the Minnesota House of Representatives.

Biography
Neuman was born on June 29, 1869 in Inver Grove Heights, Minnesota. He moved with his parents to Traverse County, Minnesota in 1886. In 1893, he married his first wife, Mary. They had one daughter before her death. On May 27, 1903, Neuman married Fannie Mapes, daughter of David P. Mapes, a former member of the New York State Assembly and founder of Ripon College. Neuman died on May 30, 1938 in Wheaton, Minnesota. He was a Lutheran.

Career
Neuman was a member of the House of Representatives from 1917 to 1932. He was a Democrat.

References

People from Inver Grove Heights, Minnesota
People from Traverse County, Minnesota
Democratic Party members of the Minnesota House of Representatives
1869 births
1938 deaths